Emma Johanna Henny "Emmy" Göring (24 March 1893 – 8 June 1973) was a German actress and the second wife of Luftwaffe Commander-in-Chief Hermann Göring. She served as Adolf Hitler's hostess at many state functions and thereby staked a claim to the title of "First Lady of the Third Reich".

Early life
She was born Emma Sonnemann in Hamburg, Germany on 24 March 1893 to a wealthy salesman. After schooling, she became an actress at the National Theatre in Weimar.

On 13 January 1916, Sonnemann married actor Karl Köstlin in Trieste, Austria-Hungary. Thereafter, she was known as Emmy Köstlin. In her autobiography, Göring said that she and Köstlin soon realized that they were more suited as friends and soon separated. They eventually divorced in 1926.

Marriage to Hermann Göring
On 10 April 1935, she married the prominent Nazi and Luftwaffe chief Hermann Göring, becoming Emmy Göring. It was also Göring's second marriage; his first wife, Carin, had died in October 1931. She was given an unsolicited membership to the Nazi Party during Christmas 1938.

Their daughter, Edda, was born on 2 June 1938. Edda was reported as being named after Countess Edda Ciano, eldest child of Benito Mussolini. Time reported: "Herr and Frau Göring became her fast friends." However, in her autobiography, Göring said her daughter was named after one of her friends.

Hermann Göring named his country house Carinhall after his first wife, while referring to his hunting lodge at Rominten (now Krasnolesye)the Reichsjägerhofas "Emmyhall".

"First Lady of the Third Reich"
Emmy Göring served as Hitler's hostess at many state functions prior to the Second World War. This and her claim to be the "First Lady of the Third Reich" created much animosity between herself and Hitler's future wife, Eva Braun, whom she snubbed and openly despised. Hitler consequently issued angry instructions to Hermann Göring demanding that Emmy treat Eva with more respect; one of the outcomes of Emmy's condescending attitude toward Eva was that she was no longer invited to Hitler's Bavarian retreat, the Berghof. As for Eva Braun, she allegedly never forgave Emmy for having assumed the role of "First Lady of the Reich".

As wife of one of the richest and most powerful men in Europe, she received much public attention, was constantly photographed, and enjoyed a lavish lifestyle well into the Second World War. Her husband owned mansions, estates and castles in Austria, Germany and Poland and was a major beneficiary of the Nazis' confiscation of art and wealth from Jews and others deemed enemies by the Nazi regime. Her husband celebrated their daughter's birth by ordering 500 planes to fly over Berlin (he stated he would have flown 1,000 planes as a salute for a son).

After the end of the war, a German denazification court convicted her of being a Nazi and sentenced her to one year in jail. When she was released, 30 percent of her property was confiscated, and she was banned from the stage for five years.

Later years and death
Some years after her release from jail, Emmy Göring secured a very small flat in a building in the city of Munich and remained there for the rest of her life. In her final years, she suffered from sciatica. She wrote an autobiography, An der Seite meines Mannes (1967), published in English as My Life with Goering in 1972. 

Emmy Göring died in Munich on 8 June 1973 at the age of 80. She is buried at Munich Waldfriedhof.

Selected filmography
William Tell (1934)

References
Notes

Sources
Gun, N.E. (1968) Eva Braun, Coronet Books.

Klee, E. (2007)  Das Kulturlexikon zum Dritten Reich. Wer war was vor und nach 1945 (The Cultural Encyclopedia of the Third Reich. Who was What before and after 1945), S. Fischer:Frankfurt am Main. .

External links

Photographs of Emmy Sonnemann
Antic piano of Emmy Sonnemann

1893 births
1973 deaths
20th-century German actresses
Burials at Munich Waldfriedhof
German anti-communists
German autobiographers
German film actresses
German stage actresses
Emmy
Nazi Party members
Actresses from Hamburg
Women in Nazi Germany